This article details the St Helens R.F.C. rugby league football club's 2016 season. This is the Saints' 21st consecutive season in the Super League.

Table

To be inserted.

World Club Series

2016 fixtures and results

2016 Super League Fixtures

2016 Super 8 Qualifiers

Player appearances
Super League Only

 = Injured

 = Suspended

Challenge Cup

Player appearances
Challenge Cup Games only

2016 squad statistics

 Appearances and points include (Super League, Challenge Cup and Play-offs) as of 22 April 2016.

 = Injured
 = Suspended

2016 transfers in/out

In

Out

References

St Helens R.F.C. seasons
Super League XXI by club